H. nigricans may refer to:
 Haplochromis nigricans, Boulenger, 1906, a fish species in the genus Haplochromis
 Heliotropium nigricans, a plant species endemic to Yemen
 Hexatoma nigricans, Edwards, 1927, a crane fly species in the genus Hexatoma
 Hirundo nigricans, the tree martin, a bird species found in Australia
 Hypoplectrus nigricans, a hamlet fish from the Western Atlantic
 Hypentelium nigricans, the northern hogsucker, a sucker fish species found in the rivers of the Mississippi basin from Oklahoma and Alabama northward to Minnesota

Synonyms
 Hypostomus nigricans, a synonym for Parancistrus aurantiacus, a catfish species

See also
 Nigricans (disambiguation)